Double Plaidinum is the fourth album by Lagwagon, released in 1997. It was their first album without the original line-up, as guitarist Shawn Dewey and drummer Derrick Plourde left the band before the recording sessions began.

Critical reception
The San Diego Union-Tribune wrote that "melody is in the driver's seat throughout the Santa Barbara quintet's fourth album, on which the standouts include the propulsive 'Confession', the breakneck 'Bad Scene', and the snappy 'Choke'."

Track listing
 "Alien 8" – 1:50
 "Making Friends" – 2:15
 "Unfurnished" – 3:15
 "One Thing to Live" – 1:28
 "Today" – 2:04
 "Confession" – 2:52
 "Bad Scene" – 1:17
 "Smile" – 2:05
 "Twenty-Seven" – 2:29
 "Choke" – 2:45
 "Failure" – 2:45
 "To All My Friends" – 6:01

Personnel
 Joey Cape - Vocals, Producer, Synthesizer
 Chris Flippin - Guitar
 Jesse Buglione - Bass Guitar
 Dave Raun - Percussion, Drums
 Ken Stringfellow - Guitar 
 Angus Cooke - Producer, Engineer
 Joe Gastwirt - Mastering
 Ryan Greene - Producer, Engineer, Mixing

Charts
Album - Billboard (United States)

References

External links

Double Plaidinum at YouTube (streamed copy where licensed)

Lagwagon albums
1997 albums
Fat Wreck Chords albums
Albums produced by Ryan Greene
Albums produced by Joey Cape